David ODB Baker (born July 14, 1972) is an American professional poker player living in Sahuarita, Arizona, who has appeared at five World Series of Poker (WSOP) final tables.  Baker currently has over $5.4 million in tournament winnings. Baker is an Auburn University alumnus.

Career
Born in Connecticut, Baker earned a finance degree from Auburn and became a business salesman. , he lived with his wife and daughter Kathy in Texas.  He had been introduced to poker in college. By the mid 1990s, he was playing pot limit omaha at casinos in New Orleans and eventually began playing three times a week at underground casinos in Houston.  He became a full-time professional poker player in 2004.

World Series of Poker
Baker currently has twenty-five WSOP in the money finishes (2011-5, 2010-7, 2009-4, 2008-2, 2007-1, 2006-5, 2004-1).  Highlighted by a 17th-place finish in the main event, his 2010 World Series of Poker performance included 7 in the money finishes, which was one behind the 2010 Series leaders. Baker's success was confusing to those following the WSOP because David "Bakes" Baker also finished in the money four times and won a World Series of Poker bracelet at the 2010 WSOP.

His first World Series of Poker cash was an 18th-place finish at the 237-player $2,500 2004 Limit Hold'em Event 11 for a prize of $4,360. His first WSOP final table was in the 720-player $1,500 2007 Limit Hold'em Shootout Event 53 for a prize of $12,776. , his highest WSOP prize was in the 7319-player $10,000 2010 No-Limit Hold'em Championship Event 57 for a prize of $396,967.

In June 2012, Baker won his first World Series of Poker bracelet in the $2,500 Eight Game Mix event, defeating Greg Mueller heads-up to earn $271,312. As of 2018, his has won over $4,400,000 playing live poker tournaments.

Baker confusion
David "Bakes" Baker, has cashed regularly at the WSOP since the 2008 World Series of Poker. ODB Baker has cashed regularly at the WSOP since 2006. Both David Bakers have had multiple in the money finishes in each WSOP since 2008 with at least 4 in each year since 2009. , the two David Bakers have twice cashed in the same WSOP event.  At the 3042-player $1,000 2010 No-Limit Hold’em Event 13, ODB placed 3rd for a prize of $206,813, while Bakes placed 59th for a prize of $6,132.  At the 817-player $5,000 2011 Triple Chance No-Limit Hold’em Event 50 Bakes placed 32nd for a prize of $21,311, while ODB placed 39th for a prize of $17,817.

Additionally, both David "ODB" Baker and David "Bakes" Baker won World Series of Poker bracelets three days apart at the 2012 World Series of Poker. ODB won $2,500 477-entrant Event #37: Eight Game Mix, while Bakes won $10,000 178-entrant Event #32: H.O.R.S.E.

See also
List of Auburn University people

Notes

External links
Baker at Card Player
Baker following 2010 WSOP ME 17th-place finish

1972 births
American poker players
World Series of Poker bracelet winners
World Poker Tour winners
Auburn University alumni
People from Connecticut
People from Katy, Texas
Living people